Anthony Joseph Brindisi (born November 22, 1978) is an American lawyer and politician from the state of New York. A Democrat, Brindisi served as the U.S. representative from New York's 22nd congressional district from 2019 to 2021. He represented New York's 119th Assembly District from 2011 to 2018.

Before his election to the New York State Assembly, Brindisi served on the Utica School Board and practiced as an attorney. He was first elected to the New York State Assembly in a September 2011 special election. Brindisi narrowly defeated Republican U.S. Representative Claudia Tenney in the 2018 election in New York's 22nd congressional district. Tenney challenged Brindisi in 2020. Initially, the 2020 election was too close to call, and its results were challenged in court. On February 5, 2021, a state trial court judge declared Tenney the winner.

Early life and education 
Brindisi was born in 1978 in Utica, New York, to Louis and Jacqueline Brindisi. He has five siblings. His great grandparents were from Mardin (present-day Turkey) and fled to Aleppo, Syria during the Armenian genocide. His mother died of cancer when he was four years old, on the same day that a murder took place at Louis's law firm. Louis gave up the practice of criminal defense law after the murder.

Brindisi graduated from Notre Dame Junior Senior High School and attended Mohawk Valley Community College before graduating from Siena College in 2000. He has said that the 2000 United States presidential election inspired him to become a lawyer. Like his father, he attended Albany Law School of Union University, New York and received his J.D. degree in 2004. He joined the law firm his father founded and later won a seat on the Utica School Board.

New York State Assembly 
Following the appointment of Assemblywoman RoAnn Destito as Commissioner of the New York State Office of General Services, Brindisi won a special election to replace her to represent the 119th Assembly district, beating Republican Gregory Johnson in a September 13, 2011, special election. He was unopposed in the 2012 general election, running on the Democratic, Working Families Party, and Independence Party of New York State fusion ticket. He was also unchallenged in 2014 and 2016.

Brindisi voted against the NY SAFE Act, a 2013 gun control law written in response to the Sandy Hook Elementary School shooting. He was endorsed by the National Rifle Association in 2016, and the NRA also gave him a 100% rating in 2017. The NRA downgraded his rating to an F during his 2018 campaign for Congress.

U.S. House of Representatives

Elections

2018

Brindisi ran for Congress in New York's 22nd congressional district, which was held by one-term Republican Claudia Tenney of nearby New Hartford. Tenney had served alongside Brindisi in the State Assembly from 2011 to 2017. Brindisi ran unopposed in the Democratic primary. He was endorsed by former Republican congressmen Richard Hanna and Sherwood Boehlert. The brand of Republicanism in central New York has traditionally been a moderate one, and Tenney was considered a staunch conservative and an outspoken supporter of President Trump.

On November 19, 2018, Brindisi declared victory. By November 20, his lead grew to over 3,900 votes, and there were not enough remaining absentee ballots for Tenney to close the gap. Tenney conceded on November 28. The 22nd voted for Donald Trump by a 15% margin over Hillary Clinton in 2016, the largest margin in any House district to change hands from a Republican to a Democrat in 2018.

Upon his swearing-in on January 3, 2019, Brindisi became only the second Democrat to represent the district in 68 years, and the third in 119 years. The last Democrat to represent this district was Mike Arcuri, who represented what was then the 24th district from 2007 to 2011. Arcuri won with 54% of the vote, becoming only the second Democrat to represent this district and its predecessors in 106 years, and the first since 1951.

2020

Brindisi sought reelection to Congress in 2020. In October 2019, Tenney announced that she would challenge him. The initial election results were too close to call, and a court challenge ensued. On December 8, a New York state judge ordered a district-wide recanvass of all ballots, including provisional ballots and disputed ballots not included in the original count. By January 29, 2021, Tenney had a 122-vote lead over Brindisi based on unofficial tallies. On February 5, 2021, New York Supreme Court Judge Scott DelConte ruled in Tenney's favor, allowing her to be declared the winner of the election by 109 votes.

Tenure
On December 18, 2019, Brindisi voted to impeach President Donald Trump for abuse of power and obstruction of Congress.

Committee assignments

 Committee on Agriculture
 Subcommittee on Biotechnology, Horticulture, and Research
 Subcommittee on Livestock and Foreign Agriculture
 Committee on Veterans' Affairs
 Subcommittee on Economic Opportunity
 Subcommittee on Health
 Armed Services Committee
 Subcommittee on Tactical Air and Land Forces
 Subcommittee on Seapower and Projection Forces

Caucus memberships 

 Blue Dog Coalition (Co-Chair for Whip)
 New Democrat Coalition

2021 campaign for Supreme Court justice
In July 2021, Brindisi announced his candidacy for state Supreme Court. He lost the 2021 race for the 5th Supreme Court District to Republican Danielle Fogel.

New York State Court of Claims 
In May 2022, Governor Kathy Hochul appointed Brindisi to the New York State Court of Claims.

Electoral history

Personal life
Brindisi lives with his wife, Erica, and their two children in Utica.

References

External links

 

|-

|-

1978 births
21st-century American politicians
Albany Law School alumni
Candidates in the 2021 United States elections
Democratic Party members of the United States House of Representatives from New York (state)
Living people
Democratic Party members of the New York State Assembly
New York (state) lawyers
Politicians from Utica, New York
School board members in New York (state)
Siena College alumni